The 2000 NCAA Division II Lacrosse Championship was the 16th annual tournament to determine the national champions of NCAA Division II men's college lacrosse in the United States.

The final, and only match of the tournament, was played at Ludwig Field at the University of Maryland in College Park, Maryland. 

Limestone defeated C.W. Post in the championship game, 10–9, to claim the Saints' first Division II national title.

Bracket

See also
2000 NCAA Division I Men's Lacrosse Championship
2000 NCAA Division I Women's Lacrosse Championship
2000 NCAA Division III Men's Lacrosse Championship

References

NCAA Division II Men's Lacrosse Championship
NCAA Division II Men's Lacrosse Championship
NCAA Division II Men's Lacrosse